The 2016 Tilia Slovenia Open was a professional tennis tournament played on hard courts. It was the fourth edition of the tournament which was part of the 2016 ATP Challenger Tour. It took place in Portorož, Slovenia between 8 – 13 August 2016.

Singles main-draw entrants

Seeds

 1 Rankings are as of August 1, 2016.

Other entrants
The following players received wildcards into the singles main draw:

  Tom Kočevar-Dešman
  Yannick Maden
  Blaž Kavčič
  Sven Lah

The following players received entry from the qualifying draw:
  Daniel Cox
  Cem İlkel
  Edan Leshem
  Vadym Ursu

The following player received entry as a lucky loser:
  Albano Olivetti

Champions

Singles

  Florian Mayer def.  Daniil Medvedev, 6–1, 6–2

Doubles

  Sergey Betov /  Ilya Ivashka def.  Tomislav Draganja /  Nino Serdarušić, 1–6, 6–3, [10–4]

External links
Official Website

Tilia Slovenia Open
Tilia Slovenia Open
2016 in Slovenian tennis